The stripe-headed round-eared bat (Tonatia saurophila) is a species of bat from family Phyllostomidae. It can be found on forests in Central and South America.

References

Bats of South America
Bats of Brazil
Mammals of Colombia
Phyllostomidae
Bats of Central America
Mammals described in 1951